Stanford Lake College is an independent, co-educational, day and boarding high school located in the Magoebaskloof area of the Limpopo Province of South Africa. The college is situated at the edge of Troutbeck Lake and Stanford Lake, and across from the Ebenezer Dam in the mountains of the Wolkberg, part of the northern Drakensberg range. The slopes are covered with indigenous forest as well as large tracts of pine forests, the most important feature of the Magoebaskloof.

Stanford Lake College is a full member of the Independent Schools Association of Southern Africa (ISASA) and of the International Round Square Organisation.

Environment 

Stanford Lake College is located on the edge of two lakes and is surrounded by forest. The college facilities include an adventure centre, "The Dream and Do Centre" and a 15 m tall climbing tower. Kayaking and canoeing take place on the water next to the centre.

Academic Programme 

The college writes the IEB examinations but has added to the traditional academic programme seen in most schools in South Africa. Instead it includes the "dad" (dream an' do) programme along with traditional classes during grades 8 and 9. The dad programme focuses on developing self-confidence along with skills needed in the modern world including problem solving, communication skills and risk taking opportunities

Boarding 

The college has four Boarding Houses.

 Founders' House was the first House on campus and has been split into two: Founders' North and Founders' South which are both boys' boarding houses.
 Ken Shuter House (girls) completed in 2005, and named for Ken Shuter, an English teacher at the college when it opened in 1998.
 Lakeside House (girls) was opened in 2004 and is named for its proximity to Lakeside Lake and after the college's holding company: Lakeside Chalets.
 Serala House (Girls) was opened at the beginning of 2010. It is named after the local mountain peak Serala which the grade 8s hike to every year. This was voted for by the students.
 Annex (girls and boys) this is a common room (with separate sides for boys and girls) for the day scholars who need a place to change for sports and to comfortably do homework.

The boarding houses are run by a senior houseparent, deputy-houseparent and a Grade 12 pupil who is elected as Head of House by the members of his/her house.

Extracurricular 

As well as running a traditional sports programme with sports such as hockey, rugby, cricket, soccer, swimming, and tennis, the college has an extracurricular programme offering sports such as rock climbing, kayaking, orienteering, mountain biking, and golf. The other co-curricular activities include chess, bridge, debating and community service projects, in accordance with the Round Square IDEALS, such as paired reading and The SMILE Program which assists in teaching local children English.

The college Interact club was started by Ashleigh van Niekerk in 2006. The club is supported by the Haenertsburg Rotary club and is thus named Haenertsburg Interact. The aim is to raise funds for local charities or people in need, the annual funds go to the president's choice of organisation. Interact has three main fund raisers during the year: they participate in the Rotary Ebenezer Mile as well as host a "Junior Bright Sparks" quiz competition for junior schools and a 24hr swim/triathlon.

Leadership 

Stanford Lake College runs itself on a multi-tiered leadership system that allows the Matric pupils to have a hand in the running of the school.
This system is (in increasing order of power)

 The Pupil Executive (PEX) consisting of the Chairpersons of each Matric Committee and the Head Boy and Girl and their Deputies
 The executive committee (EXCO) consisting of the Headmaster, Deputy-Headmaster, Staff Heads of Discipline, Sport, Academics, Boarding, the School Bursar and the Head Boy and Head Girl
 The Letaba Education Trust - the Board of Trustees - consisting of elected officials and the Headmaster

Matric Committees and SRC 

There are five committees, each chaired by an elected Matric and including seven to ten additional Matrics and a staff coordinator. These committees are

 Discipline - maintains discipline and appearance of the school body
 Grade 8 - looks after Grade 8 and other new pupils
 Sport - organises and runs sports related events
 Stanfordian - in charge of all cultural activities and social events
 SOS - in charge of any outreach and community service projects

The SRC comprises two pupils from each Grade, elected  by their grade - except for the Matrics who are directly represented by the Deputy Head Boy and Girl

Head Prefects 

The Head Boy, Head Girl and their Deputies are elected each year by the student and staff bodies. Until the election for the 2007 Head Prefects the voting was weighted such that the entire school's vote counts ⅓, the staff vote counts ⅓ and the incoming and outgoing Matric group together's vote counts ⅓. The votes are now all equal due to the Democracy input of Round Square.  The Head Prefects serve for a year from the Valediction Ceremony preceding their own Matric year until the Valediction Ceremony of their Matric Year at which they hand over office.

Headmasters/mistresses and Deputies

Chairman of the Board of Trustees

Alumni network 
Being a young school, Stanford Lake College does not have a large alumni network. Mrs Wendy Willson, the school matron, is the Alumni director and she maintains contact with past pupils.

See also

Footnotes

References

External links 

 

Round Square schools
Educational institutions established in 1998
Boarding schools in South Africa
Private schools in Limpopo
1998 establishments in South Africa